The 2009 Southeast Asian haze was an episode of large scale air pollution primarily caused by slash and burn practices used to clear land for agricultural purposes in Sumatra, Indonesia. It affected the areas surrounding the Straits of Malacca which besides Indonesia include Malaysia and Singapore.

The haze began in early June 2009 and progressively became worse toward July. With a prevailing dry season caused by El Nino, burning and hence the haze was expected to continue until August or September when the monsoon season arrived.

Malaysia

Air Pollution Index

  0-50  Good
 51-100 Moderate
101-200 Unhealthy
201-300 Very unhealthy
301- Hazardous

References

See also
 2006 Southeast Asian haze
 2013 Southeast Asian haze
 2015 Southeast Asian haze
 ASEAN Agreement on Transboundary Haze Pollution

Southeast Asian haze
Southeast Asian Haze, 2009
2009 natural disasters
2009 in Indonesia
2009 in Malaysia
2009 in Singapore
2009 in Thailand
2009 in the environment
Air pollution in Malaysia
Environment of Malaysia
Environment of Singapore
Environment of Thailand
Environmental disasters in Asia
Fires in Indonesia
Health disasters in Malaysia
Health in Singapore
Health in Thailand